A tomato slicer is an apparatus designed to slice tomatoes and other soft fruits and vegetables.

History
Tomato slicers have been sold since the 1950s. A tomato slicer was patented in the United States in 1968, by Clayton Giangiulio.

See also 
 Tomato knife
 Egg slicer
 Mandoline

References

Food preparation utensils
Kitchen knives
Tomatoes
American inventions
20th-century inventions